Delta South is a provincial electoral district for the Legislative Assembly of British Columbia, Canada.

Member of Legislative Assembly 

The current MLA for this riding is Ian Paton. The previous member was Vicki Huntington, the only Independent elected to the Assembly in the 2009 election, and was re-elected in 2013. Huntington did not seek re-election in the 2017 provincial election.

History 

The electoral district was created for the 1991 election from part of the dual-member Delta riding.

Election results 

 

|Independent
|Vicki Huntington
|align="right"|9,977
|align="right"|42.63%
|align="right"|
|align="right"|$61,113

|Independent
|John Shavluk
|align="right"|60
|align="right"|0.26%
|align="right"|
|align="right"|$250
|- bgcolor="white"
!align="right" colspan=3|Total Valid Votes
!align="right"|23,477
!align="right"|100%
!align="right"|
|- bgcolor="white"
!align="right" colspan=3|Total Rejected Ballots
!align="right"|69
!align="right"|0.29%
!align="right"|
|- bgcolor="white"
!align="right" colspan=3|Turnout
!align="right"|23,546
!align="right"|68.59%
!align="right"|
|}

|-

|-

|Independent
|Vicki Huntington
|align="right"|8,043
|align="right"|33.08%
|align="right"|
|align="right"|$23,746
 
|NDP
|Dileep Joseph Anthony Athaide
|align="right"|5,828
|align="right"|23.97%
|align="right"|
|align="right"|$19,996

|Independent
|George Mann
|align="right"|58
|align="right"|0.24%
|align="right"|
|align="right"|$9,901
|- bgcolor="white"
!align="right" colspan=3|Total Valid Votes
!align="right"|24,311
!align="right"|100%
!align="right"|
|- bgcolor="white"
!align="right" colspan=3|Total Rejected Ballots
!align="right"|88
!align="right"|0.36%
!align="right"|
|- bgcolor="white"
!align="right" colspan=3|Turnout
!align="right"|24,399
!align="right"|70.81%
!align="right"|
|}

|-

|-

 
|NDP
|Ruth Mary Adams
|align="right"|2,053
|align="right"|9.42%
|align="right"|
|align="right"|$5,268

|Independent
|George Mann
|align="right"|114
|align="right"|0.52%
|align="right"|
|align="right"|$2,265

|Independent
|Paul Dhillon
|align="right"|105
|align="right"|0.49%
|align="right"|
|align="right"|
|- bgcolor="white"
!align="right" colspan=3|Total Valid Votes
!align="right"|21,785
!align="right"|100.00%
!align="right"|
|- bgcolor="white"
!align="right" colspan=3|Total Rejected Ballots
!align="right"|64
!align="right"|0.29%
!align="right"|
|- bgcolor="white"
!align="right" colspan=3|Turnout
!align="right"|21,849
!align="right"|73.15%
!align="right"|
|}

|-

|-

 
|NDP
|Richard Tones
|align="right"|433
|align="right"|2.44%
|align="right"|
|align="right"|$14,504

|Independent
|Allan Warnke
|align="right"|153
|align="right"|0.86%
|align="right"|
|align="right"|$2,398

|- bgcolor="white"
!align="right" colspan=3|Total Valid Votes
!align="right"|17,737
!align="right"|100.00%
!align="right"|
|- bgcolor="white"
!align="right" colspan=3|Total Rejected Ballots
!align="right"|41
!align="right"|0.23%
!align="right"|
|- bgcolor="white"
!align="right" colspan=3|Turnout
!align="right"|17,778
!align="right"|59.78%
!align="right"|
|}

|-

 
|NDP
|Lloyd MacDonald
|align="right"|5,984
|align="right"|26.22%
|align="right"|
|align="right"|$5,553

|-

|- bgcolor="white"
!align="right" colspan=3|Total Valid Votes
!align="right"|22,822
!align="right"|100.00%
!align="right"|
|- bgcolor="white"
!align="right" colspan=3|Total Rejected Ballots
!align="right"|76
!align="right"|0.33%
!align="right"|
|- bgcolor="white"
!align="right" colspan=3|Turnout
!align="right"|22,898
!align="right"|74.55%
!align="right"|
|}

|-

 
|NDP
|Brent Kennedy
|align="right"|6,559
|align="right"|29.74%
|align="right"|
|align="right"|$33,043
|- bgcolor="white"
!align="right" colspan=3|Total Valid Votes
!align="right"|22,055
!align="right"|100.00%
!align="right"|
|- bgcolor="white"
!align="right" colspan=3|Total Rejected Ballots
!align="right"|286
!align="right"|0.33%
!align="right"|
|- bgcolor="white"
!align="right" colspan=3|Turnout
!align="right"|22,341
!align="right"|80.85%
!align="right"|
|-
|}

References

External links 
BC Stats Profile - 2001 (pdf)
Results of 2001 election
Results of 1996 election
Results of 1991 election
Website of the Legislative Assembly of British Columbia

British Columbia provincial electoral districts
Politics of Delta, British Columbia
Provincial electoral districts in Greater Vancouver and the Fraser Valley